Qaleh Darvish (also Romanized as Qal‘eh Darvīsh and Qal‘eh-ye Darvīsh; also known as Ghal‘eh Darvish) is a village in Poshtkuh Rural District, in the Central District of Ardal County, Chaharmahal and Bakhtiari Province, Iran. At the 2006 census, its population was 595, in 125 families.

References 

Populated places in Ardal County